Arthur Moulin (4 July 1924 – 9 May 2017) was a French politician. He joined the French Resistance during World War II. He served as a member of the National Assembly from 1958 to 1973, representing Nord. He also served as a member of the French Senate from 1983 to 1992, representing Nord. He was the mayor of Avesnes in Pas-de-Calais from 1971 to 1989.

References

1924 births
2017 deaths
People from Pas-de-Calais
Politicians from Hauts-de-France
Union for the New Republic politicians
Union of Democrats for the Republic politicians
Rally for the Republic politicians
Deputies of the 1st National Assembly of the French Fifth Republic
Deputies of the 2nd National Assembly of the French Fifth Republic
Deputies of the 4th National Assembly of the French Fifth Republic
French Senators of the Fifth Republic
Senators of Nord (French department)
Mayors of places in Hauts-de-France
French Resistance members